Gregory Adam Haile (born October 20, 1977) is an American lawyer and higher education administrator who serves as the seventh president of Broward College, part of the Florida College System. He was selected by the Broward College Board of Trustees on May 9, 2018,. and was formally installed as president on March 29, 2019.

Early life and education 
Haile was born on October 20, 1977 in Queens, New York. The first member of his family to attain a post-secondary education degree, Haile graduated magna cum laude with a Bachelor of Arts from Arizona State University, receiving the Most Outstanding Graduate award from his college.

As a Harlan Fiske Stone Scholar, Haile earned a J.D. degree from the Columbia University School of Law in 2002. During law school, he served as editor-in-chief of the National Black Law Journal and editor of the Journal on Gender and Law. He later received an Honorary Doctorate of Humane Letters from Nova Southeastern University and is a fellow of the Vanderbilt University Higher Education Management Institute.

Career 
Haile served as an adjunct professor with Broward College, teaching Business Law and Ethics in the fall semester of 2014, and with Miami Dade College, teaching Business Law from January 2003 to February 2004. From 2011 to 2018, Haile was the General Counsel and Vice President for Public Policy and Government Affairs at Broward College.

Haile has served as the seventh president of Broward College since July 2018.

During his investiture (formal installation) speech, Haile announced an expanded business model for Broward College, Broward UP™, with the goal of improving access to higher education for residents in six Broward County ZIP codes with disproportionately high unemployment rates, low education attainment, and low household income.

Under his leadership, Broward College was named a top-10 finalist for the Aspen Prize for Community College Excellence in 2019 and 2021 (with distinction), received $30 million from philanthropist MacKenzie Scott (the largest private gift in its history), and the U.S. Department of Education named Broward UP a Promise Neighborhood, awarding $30 million over five years – the largest grant in the College's history.

Every summer, Haile teaches a self-designed 4-credit course in Higher Education Law and Policy at Harvard University.

Florida Governor Ron DeSantis appointed Haile to the State of Florida's Re-Open Task Force, and to the Florida Department of Education Career and Technical Education Advisory Committee on April 22, 2020.

Professional organizations 
Haile has served on the board of directors for a variety of corporations, nonprofit organizations, and community groups, such as the Federal Reserve Bank of Atlanta, BBX Capital Corporation, Leadership Florida, Florida Chamber of Commerce, Pace Center for Girls, The Broward Workshop, United Way of Broward County, Greater Fort Lauderdale Alliance, and the Orange Bowl Committee

Awards and recognitions 
Haile has been recognized for his work and service in the business community, receiving several awards, including:

 Florida Chamber of Commerce's Florida Chair's Award, 2020
 Aspen Institute Presidential Fellowship for Community College Excellence, 2020-21
 Junior Achievement of South Florida's U.S. President's Volunteer Service Award, 2021

 South Florida Business Journal's Top 250 Power Leaders, 2019-21
 South Florida Business Journal's South Florida Ultimate CEOs, 2021

References 

1977 births
Living people
American lawyers
Florida lawyers